Bendegúz Pétervári-Molnár (born 14 March 1993) is a Hungarian rower. 

Pétervári-Molnár was born in 1993. His father, the Olympic rower Zoltán Molnár, is his coach. His uncle, Pál Pétervári, has represented Hungary in sprint canoe at world championships.

Pétervári-Molnár placed 14th in the men's single sculls event at the 2016 Summer Olympics. He is competing at the 2020 Tokyo Olympics in men's single sculls.

References

1993 births
Living people
Hungarian male rowers
Olympic rowers of Hungary
Rowers at the 2016 Summer Olympics
Rowers at the 2020 Summer Olympics